In genetics, rs28363170 (DAT1-VNTR) is a genetic variation at SLC6A3, the gene that encodes the dopamine transporter. It is polymorphism as a 40 base pairs VNTR in the 3' untranslated region.
It is a deletion/insertion polymorphism (DIP).

The 9-repeat and the 10-repeat are the most common alleles.

References

Further